Adrian Glenn Abrams Jr. (born October 16, 1986) is an American former professional basketball player.

High school career
Abrams went to Deerpark Middle School and McNeil High School in Round Rock, Texas, where he is the school's all-time scoring leader with 2,559 career points.  He was a three-time district MVP and a three-time district All-First-Team pick. Abrams averaged 16.6 points and 1.3 steals per game as a high school senior and lead his team to 35–4 record, Regional Finalist.

College career

In his freshman year with the University of Texas, Abrams averaged 6.4 points and 3.0 assists and was named to the Big 12 All-Freshman team. In his sophomore year, Abrams started all 35 games averaging 15.5 points and led the team with a 92.4 free throw percentage. He was selected as an All-Big 12 Honorable Mention.  In his junior year he averaged 16.2 points per game and was named to the All-Big 12 Second Team.  Abrams also was the 28th player in Texas men's basketball history to score 1,000 career points. On January 31, 2009, Abrams broke the Big 12 career record for 3-pointers in an 81–85 loss to Kansas State, breaking the mark of 338 held by Kansas's Jeff Boschee.

Professional career
Abrams signed with the Greek League club Trikala 2000 in 2009. He signed with the Italian Second Division club Scaligera Basket Verona in 2010.

Awards and accomplishments

College
2006–07 All-Big 12 Honorable Mention
2007–08 All-Big 12 Second Team
2008–09 All-Big 12 Second Team

References

External links
Greek League Profile 
Italian Second Division Profile 
ČEZ Nymburk profile
Statistics @ ESPN

1986 births
Living people
American expatriate basketball people in Greece
American expatriate basketball people in Italy
American expatriate basketball people in the Czech Republic
Basketball players from Texas
Basketball Nymburk players
People from Round Rock, Texas
People from Sherman, Texas
Point guards
Scaligera Basket Verona players
Texas Longhorns men's basketball players
Trikala B.C. players
American men's basketball players